This is a list of people who have served as Lord Lieutenant of Essex. Since 1688, all the Lord Lieutenants have also been Custos Rotulorum of Essex.

John Petre, 1st Baron Petre
John de Vere, 16th Earl of Oxford 1558–?
Robert Dudley, 1st Earl of Leicester 3 July 1585 – 4 September 1588
William Cecil, 1st Baron Burghley 31 December 1588 – 4 August 1598
vacant
Robert Radclyffe, 5th Earl of Sussex 26 August 1603 – 5 February 1629 jointly with
Robert Rich, 2nd Earl of Warwick 8 September 1625 – 1642 jointly with
Richard Weston, 1st Earl of Portland 5 February 1629 – 31 March 1635 and
William Maynard, 1st Baron Maynard 6 August 1635 – 17 December 1640 and
James Hay, 2nd Earl of Carlisle 8 January 1641 – 1642
Interregnum
Aubrey de Vere, 20th Earl of Oxford 13 August 1660 – 1687 jointly with
Christopher Monck, 2nd Duke of Albemarle 30 November 1675 – 1687
Thomas Petre, 6th Baron Petre 18 February 1688 – 1688
Aubrey de Vere, 20th Earl of Oxford 25 October 1688 – 12 March 1703
Francis North, 2nd Baron Guilford 23 March 1703 – 1705
Richard Savage, 4th Earl Rivers 16 April 1705 – 18 August 1712
Henry St John, 1st Viscount Bolingbroke 24 October 1712 – 1714
Henry Howard, 6th Earl of Suffolk 7 January 1715 – 19 September 1718
Charles Howard, 7th Earl of Suffolk 10 December 1718 – 9 February 1722
Henry O'Brien, 8th Earl of Thomond 2 April 1722 – 20 April 1741
Benjamin Mildmay, 1st Earl Fitzwalter 7 May 1741 – 29 February 1756
William Nassau de Zuylestein, 4th Earl of Rochford 3 April 1756 – 28 September 1781
John Waldegrave, 3rd Earl Waldegrave 7 November 1781 – 22 October 1784
John Griffin, 4th Baron Howard de Walden 17 November 1784 – 25 May 1797
Richard Griffin, 2nd Baron Braybrooke 27 January 1798 – 28 February 1825
Henry Maynard, 3rd Viscount Maynard 19 April 1825 – 19 May 1865
Thomas Crosbie William Trevor, 22nd Baron Dacre 5 October 1865 – 1869
Sir Thomas Burch Western, 1st Baronet 11 May 1869 – 30 May 1873
Chichester Parkinson-Fortescue, 1st Baron Carlingford 4 September 1873 – 1892
John Strutt, 3rd Baron Rayleigh 2 February 1892 – 1 August 1901
Francis Greville, 5th Earl of Warwick 1 August 1901 – 1919
Amelius Lockwood, 1st Baron Lambourne 11 February 1919 – 26 December 1928
Sir Richard Beale Colvin 31 January 1929 – 1936
Sir Francis Henry Douglas Charlton Whitmore, 1st Baronet 16 April 1936 – 1958
Sir John Ruggles-Brise, 2nd Baronet 6 September 1958 – 1978
Sir Andrew Lewis 1978–1992
Robin Neville, 10th Baron Braybrooke 3 August 1992 – October 2002
John Petre, 18th Baron Petre 16 December 2002 – 4 August 2017
Jennifer Tolhurst 5 August 2017 – present

Deputy lieutenants
A deputy lieutenant of Essex is commissioned by the Lord Lieutenant of Essex. Deputy lieutenants support the work of the lord-lieutenant. There can be several deputy lieutenants at any time, depending on the population of the county. Their appointment does not terminate with the changing of the lord-lieutenant, but they usually retire at age 75.

18th Century
15 February 1793: Thomas Gardiner Bramston, Esq.
15 February 1793: George Davis Carr, Esq.
23 March 1797: William Manley, Esq.
23 March 1797: Jackson Barwis, Esq.
9 July 1803: George Lee, Esq.
9 July 1803: John Crosse Godsalve Crosse, Esq.
9 July 1803: John Wallinger Arnold Wallinger, Esq.
9 July 1803: John Hopkins Dare, Esq.

References

External links
Official Website

Sources
 

Essex